The 2008–09 season was Galatasarays 105th in existence and the 51st consecutive season in the Süper Lig. This article shows statistics of the club's players in the season, and also lists all matches that the club have played in the season.

Current squad
As of March 10, 2009; according to the official website. .

 

 

 

Transfers

In

Out

Loaned out

Squad statistics

Statistics accurate as of match played June 1, 2009

Competitions

Turkish Super CupAll times at CESTSüper Lig

League table

Results summary

Results by round

MatchesKick-off listed in local time (EEST)Turkish CupKick-off listed in local time (EEST)Group stage

Quarter-finals

UEFA Champions LeagueAll times at CETThird qualifying round

UEFA CupAll times at CET''

First round

Group stage

Knockout phase

Round of 32

Round of 16

Attendance

References

External links
 Galatasaray Sports Club Official Website 
 Turkish Football Federation - Galatasaray A.Ş. 
 uefa.com - Galatasaray AŞ

2008-09
Turkish football clubs 2008–09 season
2000s in Istanbul
Galatasaray Sports Club 2008–09 season